is a 1939 Japanese war film directed by Tomotaka Tasaka. It is based on the novel of the same name by Ashihei Hino.

Cast
 Isamu Kosugi

References

External links
 

Films directed by Tomotaka Tasaka
Nikkatsu films
Japanese war films
1939 war films
Films shot in China
Japanese black-and-white films
1930s Japanese-language films